Dangerous Intrigue is a 1936 American drama film directed by David Selman and starring Ralph Bellamy, Gloria Shea and Joan Perry.

Main cast
 Ralph Bellamy as Tony Halliday  
 Gloria Shea as Gerta Kosovic  
 Joan Perry as Carol Andrews  
 Fred Kohler as Brant  
 Frederick Vogeding as Joe Kosovec  
 Edward LeSaint as Dr. Miller  
 Georgie Billings as Danny Brant  
 Boyd Irwin as Dr. Wagner  
 Gene Morgan as Taxi Driver  
 Stanley Andrews as Mr. Mitchell

References

Bibliography
 James Monaco. The Encyclopedia of Film. Perigee Books, 1991.

External links
 

1936 films
1936 drama films
1930s English-language films
American drama films
Films about amnesia
Films directed by David Selman
Columbia Pictures films
American black-and-white films
1930s American films